James Gibson Cuthbert (1875-1959), was a Scottish born bowls player who competed at the British Empire Games for England.

Bowls career
He participated in the 1938 British Empire Games at Sydney in the fours/rinks event and finished in fifth place.

Personal life
He was a member of the Institution of Civil Engineers and a public works park contractor by trade and lived at 10 Lonsdale Avenue and later 33 Park Lane, Wembley.

References

English male bowls players
Scottish male bowls players
Bowls players at the 1938 British Empire Games
1875 births
1959 deaths
Commonwealth Games competitors for England